Väänänen is a Finnish surname. Notable people with the surname include:

Ari Väänänen (born 1947), Finnish long jumper
Emma Väänänen (1907–1970), Finnish actress
Iivar Väänänen (1887–1959), Finnish sport shooter
Jesse Väänänen (born 1984), Finnish cross country skier
Jouko Väänänen (born 1950), Finnish mathematical logician
Jussi Väänänen, Finnish dancer
Kari Väänänen (born 1953), Finnish actor
Marjatta Väänänen (1923-2020), Finnish politician
Ossi Väänänen (born 1980), Finnish ice hockey player

See also
Näkymätön Viänänen, a comic strip by Jorma "Jope" Pitkänen

Finnish-language surnames